BOTY could refer to:
Battle of the Year, a breakdancing competition
Breakthrough of the Year, an award given by the journal Science